Yuka Anzai (born 14 October 1996) is a Japanese professional footballer who plays as a midfielder for WE League club JEF United Chiba Ladies.

Club career 
Anzai made her WE League debut on 16 October 2021.

References 

WE League players
Living people
1996 births
Japanese women's footballers
Women's association football midfielders
Association football people from Chiba Prefecture
JEF United Chiba Ladies players